Hinduism is a minor religion in Bulgaria.
Hinduism spread to Bulgaria by ISKCON.
ISKCON started spreading Krishna Consciousness to Bulgarians from 1996.

Indians in Bulgaria

There are 157 Indians that live and work in Bulgaria. There are no Hindu temples in Bulgaria.

Rathayatra in Bulgaria

The first Rathayatra parade in Bulgaria was organized in 1996. 
Till March 2008, twelve Rathayatra festivals were celebrated in Bulgaria.
The Bulgarian Rathayatra festival was the first in the Balkans.

Rathayatra is one of the Major Vaishnava Festival celebrated by Krishna’s devotees in Bulgaria, and it is attended even by devotees from neighboring Macedonia and Serbia.

Yoga in Bulgaria
Yoga is gaining popularity in Bulgaria.

References

External links
Hindu Influence in Communist Bulgaria
Krishna Scenes in Bulgaria
ISKCON Bulgaria 

Ratha Yatra Sofia - 28-29 June 2006, 22-23 June 2007; Photo Gallery
Sahaja Yoga in Bulgaria

Bulgaria
Bulgaria
Religion in Bulgaria